Great Brook is a tributary of the Passaic River in the U.S. state of New Jersey.

Great Brook passes through the borough of Bernardsville.

See also
 List of rivers of New Jersey

Tributaries of the Passaic River
Rivers of New Jersey
Rivers of Somerset County, New Jersey